Techno-animism or technoanimism is a culture of technological practice where technology is imbued with human and spiritual characteristics. It assumes that technology, humanity and religion can be integrated into one entity. As an anthropology theory, techno-animism examines the interactions between the material and the spiritual aspects of technology in relation to humans. Techno-animism has been studied in the context of Japan, since techno-animism traces most of its roots to the Shinto religion, and also in DIY culture where Actor–network theory and non-human agencies have been labeled as techno-animist practices.

Background and history 

The practice of instilling human and spiritual characteristics into physical objects has always been part of the Shinto religion. Deities in the Shinto religion often symbolizes objects of the physical world and their statues often take human forms. With these practices, people form tighter bonds with physical objects. In Japanese culture, the interaction between humans and non-human objects is critical to the harmonious coexistence of humans and nature. A prime example of this type of interaction is that before meals, Japanese people always say "itadakimasu" which expresses gratitude for the ingredients of the meal may it be animals or plants.

Techno-animism builds upon the practices of the Shinto religion by instilling human and spiritual characteristics into technology. As for representation, techno-animism is often embodied in the engineering design of objects and the way that people interact with those objects. In a larger social context, Techno-animism provides a means for technology to be integrated into the human society because new technology can always be instilled with traditional values.

Examples of Techno-animism also exist within the context of the DIY ethic and Maker culture: linking contemporary theories of material agency and Material culture with post-modern ideas of Animism and ethnographies " with recent academic studies suggesting that a form of Techno-animism can be observed in the highly developed practices of material engagement present in certain Do it yourself sub-cultures  recorded in contemporary ethnographic studies of technology.

Examples 

The design of certain objects can have human-related traits that illustrate techno-animism. A robot designed by Honda called ASIMO takes the form of an astronaut wearing a spacesuit. The form factor along with the spiritual values associated with space exploration makes ASIMO an embodiment of techno-animism. In addition, ASIMO can also communicate with humans through language and gestures. Communication is a defining factor of determining whether something is an individual being or not. In Japan, the robot industry offers a wide range of functions from talking robots to sex robots. Conversation and sexual relationships used to be concepts that only belonged to humans. However, technological advancements and techno-animism are breaking down that barrier with engineering designs that embodies human and spiritual characteristics.

Beyond the design of objects, the way that people choose to interact with objects could also demonstrate techno-animism. In Shinjuku, Tokyo, there is a restaurant where the waiters are robots instead of humans. Rather than talking to another person, customers only interact with machines throughout the dining process. In this process, customers accept the fact that technology has become part of the human society and has a unique way of interacting with humans.

Social implications 
Japanese culture and legislation are generally supportive of the techno-animism trend. Considering that Japan's modernization took place in a relatively short period of time in comparison to western nations, techno-animism is seen as a major reason why Japan has been one of the world's centers of technological innovations. As a result, acceptance of techno-animism is the current attitude in Japan both culturally and legislatively.

See also 
 Digital sublime
 Twipsy

References 

Technology in society
Animism in Asia
Shinto in Japan
Science and technology in Japan
Society of Japan